Biren Synclare Ealy (born July 7, 1984) is a former American football wide receiver. He was signed by the Titans as an undrafted free agent in 2007. He played college football at Houston and Arizona.

Ealy was also a member of the New Orleans Saints, Baltimore Ravens, Green Bay Packers, Omaha Nighthawks and Sacramento Mountain Lions.

External links
Houston Cougars bio
Just Sports Stats

1984 births
Living people
People from Clarksville, Tennessee
Players of American football from Tennessee
American football wide receivers
Arizona Wildcats football players
Houston Cougars football players
Tennessee Titans players
New Orleans Saints players
Baltimore Ravens players
Green Bay Packers players
Omaha Nighthawks players
Sacramento Mountain Lions players